Nick Stevens is an Australian rules footballer.

Nick Stevens may also refer to:

 Nick Stevens (American football), American football player
 Nick Stevens (cricketer), cricketer